Ming yun is a concept of the personal life and destiny in the Chinese folk religion. Ming is "life" or "right", the given status of life, and yùn defines "circumstance" and "individual choice"; mìng is given and influenced by the transcendent force Tiān (天), that is the same as the "divine right" (tiān mìng) of ancient rulers as identified by Mencius. Personal destiny (mìng yùn) is thus perceived as both fixed (the status of life) and flexible, open-ended (the individual choice in matters of bào yìng).

See also 
 Bao ying
 Yuanfen
 Wu

References

Sources 
 Fan Lizhu, Chen Na. The Revival of Indigenous Religion in China. Fudan University, 2013.

Concepts in Chinese folk religion
Confucianism